Lindenau is a quarter of Leipzig, in Saxony, Germany. It is part of the Stadtbezirk (borough) Alt-West.

Parks
Palmengarten (Leipzig)

References

External links
History
Pictures

Geography of Leipzig